Is It Wrong to Try to Pick Up Girls in a Dungeon? is an anime series based on the light novel series created by Fujino Ōmori. The story follows the exploits of Bell Cranel, a 14-year-old solo adventurer under the goddess Hestia. 

The anime is produced by J.C.Staff and directed by Hideki Tachibana. The second season adapts volumes six to eight of the light novel.


Episode list

Notes

References

External links
  
 

Is It Wrong to Try to Pick Up Girls in a Dungeon? episode lists
2019 Japanese television seasons